This is a list of all Scottish Parliaments and Governments (called the Scottish Executive from 1999 until 2008) the time of the introduction of devolved government for Scotland in 1999.

List

See also 
List of First Ministers of Scotland
List of British governments
List of Northern Ireland Executives
List of Welsh Governments

 
Scotland